Red Sulphur Springs is an unincorporated community in Hardin County, Tennessee. Red Sulphur Springs is located on Tennessee State Route 57 near the Tennessee River and just north of the Mississippi border.

The community takes its name from a nearby mineral spring of the same name.

References

Unincorporated communities in Hardin County, Tennessee
Unincorporated communities in Tennessee